Junior Arias (born 17 May 1993) is a Uruguayan footballer who plays as a forward for Atenas, on loan from Argentine Primera División side Talleres de Córdoba.

References

External links

Living people
1993 births
Uruguayan footballers
Uruguayan expatriate footballers
Pan American Games gold medalists for Uruguay
Footballers at the 2015 Pan American Games
Pan American Games medalists in football
Association football forwards
Medalists at the 2015 Pan American Games
Uruguayan Primera División players
Uruguayan Segunda División players
Argentine Primera División players
Liverpool F.C. (Montevideo) players
El Tanque Sisley players
Peñarol players
Talleres de Córdoba footballers
Club Atlético Banfield footballers
Club Atlético Patronato footballers
Barracas Central players
Atenas de San Carlos players
Uruguayan expatriate sportspeople in Argentina
Expatriate footballers in Argentina